Narum may refer to:

Narom language, sometimes spelt Narum, a Malayo-Polynesian language
Narum (group), a Norwegian folk/country group 

Persons
Bill Narum (1947-2009), American artist, illustrator, and Texas counter-culture icon
Buster Narum, (1940–2004), American baseball player